Peter Wishart (born 9 March 1962) is a Scottish National Party (SNP) politician and musician who has served as the Member of Parliament (MP) for Perth and North Perthshire, formerly North Tayside, since the 2001 general election.

Wishart is currently the SNP Shadow Leader of the House in the House of Commons and the chair of the Scottish Affairs Select Committee. He has previously served as the SNP's Westminster Spokesperson for the Constitution and for Culture and Sport and Chief Whip. He is also a former keyboard player of the Scottish Celtic rock bands Runrig and Big Country.

He is the longest currently-serving Scottish National Party MP.

Background
Born in Dunfermline in 1962, Wishart was educated at Queen Anne High School Dunfermline and Moray House College, Edinburgh. Wishart lives in Perth and has one son and enjoys walking in the Perthshire hills. Wishart is a trained community worker and has been a director of the Fast Forward charity that promotes healthy lifestyles for young people. He was a member of the Scotland Against Drugs Campaign Committee and has contributed to many national forums looking at the problem of drugs within Scottish society.

His brother, Alan Wishart is also a musician, and plays bass.

Music
Wishart was, for 15 years, a member of the Scottish group Runrig.

Wishart appeared on Kingfishers Catch Fire Radio Kampala with Clive Parker on the songs Bella and Battle Scars.

Pete Wishart's first major band was Big Country which he joined in the early 1980s, along with his brother Alan. He initially joined during a period when Big Country were a support act for Alice Cooper's tour. The main force behind Big Country was Stuart Adamson, himself from near Dunfermline. Adamson claimed that the early Big Country were thrown off the Alice Cooper tour for "being too weird".

After the departure of Richard Cherns in February 1986, Wishart joined Runrig. Wishart was a performer on seven of Runrig's studio albums, from The Cutter and the Clan (1987), to his last The Stamping Ground (2001). He also appears on several of Runrig's live albums. Wishart's tenure in the band coincided with their sign-up to the Chrysalis Records label, and their most successfully commercial period in the late eighties and early nineties. Wishart was not the only politically minded member of the band - former lead singer Donnie Munro became a Labour Party candidate.

Wishart is a founder member of the parliamentary rock group MP4. The other members are Ian Cawsey (bass guitar and vocals), Greg Knight MP (drums) and Kevin Brennan MP (lead guitar and vocals).

House of Commons
He was first elected to the House of Commons at the 2001 general election, taking John Swinney's old seat of Tayside North. Since arriving at Westminster, he has served as the SNP's Chief Whip, in which role he has pressed the government for greater parliamentary rights, such as better representation on committees, for both the SNP and other minor political parties. He has also campaigned for copyright term extension and is a vice-chair of the All Party Parliamentary Intellectual Property Group.

In 2003, he voted against parliamentary approval for the invasion of Iraq.

In the light of the reduction in the number of Scottish MPs at Westminster, Wishart's former constituency was abolished in a radical boundary revision, and at the 2005 general election; he won the new constituency of Perth and North Perthshire for the SNP with a majority of 1,521 over Douglas Taylor of the Conservatives. The Perth and North Perthshire constituency was created after boundary changes in Scotland and takes in East and Highland Perthshire, the City of Perth and the Carse of Gowrie. Wishart sat on the Scottish Affairs Select Committee.

In November 2010, Wishart suggested that Scottish football referees should declare which club sides they support.

In August 2014 Wishart confidently predicted that Alex Salmond would beat Alistair Darling in a televised debate about Scottish independence, telling journalists that "the slaughter will be worse than the Bannockburn re-enactment”. Salmond quizzed Darling, among other things, about alien invasion, while Darling questioned him about what currency an independent Scotland would use. An exit poll suggested most viewers thought Darling had won the debate and journalists panned Salmond's performance.

In January 2015, Wishart secured and started a debate on the reform of the House of Lords.

Politically, he is well known for campaigning to demolish Perth's listed City Hall, dating from 1911, and replace it with an open square. He has described the building as "unused, unloved and increasingly unwelcome", "a building whose time has passed", and said that, "A city square will allow us to attract visitors, grow our café quarter, put on outdoor events and properly organise civic and community events. Every city needs civic space and we must ensure that we will soon have ours."

Following the 2015 general election, it was announced in June 2015 that he would chair the Scottish Affairs Select Committee, with his appointment formally announced on 19 June 2015.
At the snap 2017 general election, he retained his seat by a very marginal majority, beating Conservative Ian Duncan by just 21 votes. The Daily Telegraph described Wishart's win as "a rare bright moment for the Nationalists" in an election that saw the SNP vote plummet and pro-Union parties gain 21 seats.

In 2016, Wishart suggested to the House of Commons the possibility of the Palace of Westminster being turned into a tourist attraction and for Parliament to move to a more modern building.

Wishart said publicly in September 2017 that because voters were “weary of constitutional change” there should be no second referendum on Scottish independence for that parliament, but that the SNP should seek a mandate for a new one in the 2021 Scottish parliament election. In October 2017, Wishart told an Institute of Economic Affairs conference that federalism for the UK should be welcomed "as part of that conversation" in Scotland, although he stressed federalism would not see Scotland "equal to some region of England".

In January 2018, Wishart drew media attention for holding up a placard which read "nul points" in the House of Commons, after having asked Prime Minister Theresa May how she would rate her government's handling of Brexit from one to ten. After May had answered, Wishart received a warning by Speaker of the House John Bercow for the stunt.

In February 2018, he warned that the SNP risked alienating Scottish voters who had voted "Leave" in the 2016 referendum on European Union membership. In an article for The National, he wrote that his party had to "face up" to the reality that Scotland would be leaving the European Union, and made the case for an alternative vision of Scottish independence which involved a "graduated" re-entry to the European Union from  "EEA, then EFTA then full EU membership", stressing that the final step of rejoining the EU should only be done with the "full consent of an independent Scottish Parliament". Later in February, he ruled himself out of the 2018 Scottish Depute Leadership election following the resignation of Angus Robertson. Wishart concluded that he did not have "sufficient support" to run for the Depute Leadership of the Scottish National Party.

Controversies 
In 2014 Wishart and three other SNP colleagues (out of a possible six) missed a vote on Andrew George's private member's bill that would repeal some aspects of the bedroom tax, despite the SNP making opposition to the bedroom tax a central part of its campaign for a yes vote in that year's independence referendum. Wishart apologised and said a 20-minute delay in his flight had caused him to miss the vote. Scottish Labour MSP Johann Lamont said: “Far from standing up for Scotland, the SNP have stayed at home and let Scotland down.” The vote passed 306 to 231.

In December 2014 he labelled No voters "Nawbags", a characterisation he later said he regretted, admitting he sometimes got things "disastrously wrong" on social media.

In 2016 he was condemned after tweeting that supporters of Tony Blair were "now like an embarrassing incontinent old relative who you might go and visit occasionally.” Labour MSP Neil Findlay said the remark was "totally unacceptable for an elected MP to mock elderly people in care homes or patients suffering the misery of incontinence" and Wishart deleted the tweet.

Also in 2016 JK Rowling questioned Wishart's conduct on social media. When STV's Digital Politics and Comment Editor, Stephen Daisley, tweeted, "In England, people tweet journalists demanding they hold government to account. In Scotland, people tweet journalists demanding they don’t”, Wishart queried the remark in a tweet to STV and Rowling tweeted him in reply, "Is trying to intimidate journalists you dislike a Scottish National Party policy or a personal vendetta?" Daisley later stopped writing opinion pieces for STV after alleging that complaints from Wishart and John Nicolson, another SNP MP, had frightened executives at the channel. The pair was accused of "gagging" him. However, the SNP denied this was the case: “At no point did they ask for Mr Daisley to stop writing and any suggestion otherwise is completely untrue. Any editorial decisions are entirely a matter for STV.” Daisley subsequently resigned, saying he felt unsupported by bosses and labelled Wishart and Nicolson "figureheads of the anti-journalism wing of the SNP, a faction which has come to define the party’s attitudes to scrutiny and accountability."

In 2017 he tweeted a picture of a mock ballot paper that described pro-union candidates as "wank", "wanker", and "absolute total wanks". The Scottish Conservatives said the tweet was "staggering" and called for the SNP whip to be removed from Wishart.

Discography

Singles and EPs 
Kingfishers Catch Fire
 "Radio Kampala" EP: on "Bella"/"Battle Scars" tracks, 12" vinyl EP, 1986 Furry/Rough Trade "Bella"/"Battle Scars", 12" vinyl EP, 1986 Furry/Rough Trade

Runrig
 Alba / Worker for the Wind (1987), Chrysalis Records
 Protect and Survive (1988), Chrysalis Records
 "News from Heaven" (1989), Chrysalis Records
 "Every River"	(1989), Chrysalis Records		
 "Wonderful"(1993), Chrysalis Records
 "The Greatest Flame" (1993), Chrysalis Records
 "This Time of Year" (1994), Chrysalis Records
 "An Ubhal as Àirde" (1995, Released following use of track in TV advert for Carlsberg lager), Chrysalis Records
 "Things That Are" (1995), Chrysalis Records
 "Rhythm of My Heart"	(1996, Cover of Rod Stewart song), Chrysalis Records
 "The Greatest Flame (1996 Remix)", Chrysalis Records	
 "The Message"	(1999), Chrysalis Records
 "Maymorning" (1999), Chrysalis Records	
 "This Is Not a Love Song" (1999), Chrysalis Records	
 "Book of Golden Stories" (2001), Chrysalis Records
 "Loch Lomond (Hampden Remix)" (2007, with Tartan Army), Chrysalis Records

MP4
 You Can't Always Get What You Want (2016) Chrysalis Records (track released under the artist title 'The Friends of Jo Cox' and features MP4 with other artists)

EPs
Runrig
"Capture the Heart EP"	(1990), Chrysalis Records	
 "Hearthammer EP" (1991), Chrysalis Records
 "Flower of the West EP" (1991), Chrysalis Records

Studio albums
Runrig

MP4
 House Music EP (2005) Busy Bee Records
 Cross Party (2010) Revolver Records
 MP4 - EP5 (2018) Revolver Records

Live albums
Runrig

Note: This table shows commercial live releases. Other live audio material has been released in the "Access All Areas" series for the official Runrig Fan Club.

Compilation albums
Big Country
 And in the Beginning 

Runrig
 Alba - The Best of Runrig
 Long Distance – The Best of Runrig'
 The Gaelic Collection  (1998)
 Beat The Drum (1998)
 30 Year Journey – The Best (2005)
 50 Great Songs  Stepping Down The Glory Road - The Chrysalis Years  Rarities''

References

External links

Constituency website

SNP profile
SNP Westminster Group
BBC News Democracy Live 
STV News Profile
Guardian profile
Telegraph profile

Scottish National Party MPs
1962 births
Living people
Members of the Parliament of the United Kingdom for Scottish constituencies
Scottish pop musicians
Big Country members
UK MPs 2001–2005
UK MPs 2005–2010
UK MPs 2010–2015
UK MPs 2015–2017
UK MPs 2017–2019
UK MPs 2019–present
Politicians from Dunfermline
Scottish rock musicians
Runrig members
Alumni of the University of Edinburgh
People educated at Queen Anne High School, Dunfermline
People associated with Perth and Kinross
British rock keyboardists
Scottish keyboardists